Seven Islands or Seven Isles may refer to:

 the Ionian Islands in Greece, which are also known as the Heptanese or the Seven Islands
 Seven Islands of Bombay, the seven islands which united to form the island of Bombay
 Seven Islands (West Virginia), a group of seven bar islands in West Virginia, U.S.
 Seven Islands Land Company, a land and timber management holding company of Maine, U.S.
 Seven Islands Republic, a former republic in the Ionian Islands
 Seven Isles (Fort Lauderdale), neighborhood in Fort Lauderdale, Florida, U.S.
 Seven Isles, a fictional archipelago in Narnia

See also
 Seven Isles (disambiguation)
 Sept-Îles (disambiguation)
 Sjuøyane (Seven Islands), part of the Svalbard Archipelago in Arctic Norway